John Randolph Haynes (1853–1937) was a prominent California socialist and progressive in the early 20th century who helped steer many of state's reforms. His Direct Democracy League was responsible for the state amendment which brought the reform to the local level and recall of the first public official in state history.

Early life
Haynes was born on June 13, 1853 in Fairmont Springs, Pennsylvania, a coal mining community. During his youth the family moved to Philadelphia where he would eventually go on to earn his medical doctorate from the University of Pennsylvania. He opened a medical practice and married women's suffragist Dorothy Fellows.

California
In 1887, the family moved to Los Angeles where he became one of the city's busiest physicians. In 1897 he helped organize a chapter of the Union Reform League, a socialist movement.

Direct Democracy League
John Randolph Haynes, encouraged by success in Los Angeles, organized the Direct Legislation League of California in 1902 to launch the campaign for inclusion of the initiative and referendum in the state's constitution. In 1902 and later in 1904, the league sent questionnaires to prospective candidates to the state legislature to obtain their stance on direct legislation and to make those positions public. Haynes, paying most of the expenses himself, and the league flooded the state with letters seeking new members, money, and endorsements from organizations like the State Federation of Labor. They presented a petition signed by 22,000 voters to the state legislation in 1903. The league also mailed 2,000 blank forms to the members of over 300 labor unions, requesting them to petition state representatives and senators from their districts. The Direct Legislation League of California continued to ask for assistance in their campaign including Haynes making a direct appeal to the National American Woman's Suffrage Association asking for support and consideration of the relevance of direct legislation to their cause. Despite the various efforts and attempts, the 1903, 1905, and 1907 legislatures refused to approve the league's proposed amendments.

In 1902 his Direct Democracy League won a state constitutional amendment establishing direct democracy at the local level, and the following year he began advising Gov. Hiram Johnson.  In 1904, the league successfully recalled California's first public official.

Later years
Haynes sat on the freeholders board in 1924 which created the charter that operates the city today, and he would also serve during this time on the civil service commission and as a member of the Board of Water and Power Commissioners. Haynes served on the University of California Board of Regents and nationally advocated for labor protection laws of coal miners and other workers. He was also Southern California's leading advocate for the national Native American population.

Death and legacy
Haynes died at Good Samaritan Hospital in Los Angeles on October 30, 1937, leaving behind a political legacy still present today through the Haynes Foundation, a social research institution, and the city's oldest private foundation.

References

Further reading
 Crouch, Winston W. "John Randolph Haynes and his work for direct government." National Municipal Review 27 (1938): 434-453. at HeinOnline.  

 Piott, Steven L.  American Reformers, 1870-1920: Progressives in Word and Deed (2006); chapter 11 is on Haynes.
 Sitton, Tom. John Randolph Haynes, California Progressive (Stanford UP, 1992), a standard scholarly biography.
 Sitton, Tom. " 'Promoting the Well-Being of Mankind': The John Randolph Haynes and Dora Haynes Foundation." Southern California Quarterly 70.1 (1988): 97-106.

1853 births
1937 deaths
American socialists
American primary care physicians